Nanli may refer to:

Nanli Subdistrict, Huaibei, Anhui, China
Nanli Township, Qin County, Shanxi, China
Nho Quế River, a river of Vietnam and China, known in China as Nanli River (南利河)